The Roman Catholic Diocese of Texcoco (erected 30 April 1960) is a suffragan diocese of the Archdiocese of Tlalnepantla.

Bishops

Ordinaries
Francisco Ferreira Arreola (1960–1977) 
Magín Camerino Torreblanca Reyes (1978–1997) 
Carlos Aguiar Retes (1997–2009), appointed Archbishop of Tlalnepantla; elevated to Cardinal in 2016
Juan Manuel Mancilla Sánchez (2009–Present)

Auxiliary bishops
Magín Camerino Torreblanca Reyes (1972-1978), appointed Bishop here
Juan Manuel Mancilla Sánchez (2001-2005), appointed Bishop of Ciudad Obregón, Sonora (later returned to this diocese as Bishop)

Other priests of this diocese who became bishops
Luis Artemio Flores Calzada, appointed Bishop of Valle de Chalco, México in 2003
Víctor René Rodríguez Gómez, appointed Bishop of Valle de Chalco, México in 2012
Guillermo Francisco Escobar Galicia, appointed Bishop of Teotihuacán, México in 2008
Jorge Cuapio Bautista, appointed Auxiliary Bishop of Tlalnepantla, México in 2015

Territorial losses

External links and references

Texcoco
Christian organizations established in 1960
Roman Catholic dioceses and prelatures established in the 20th century
Texcoco, Roman Catholic Diocese of
1960 establishments in Mexico
Texcoco, State of Mexico